Predescu is a Romanian surname that may refer to:

Alin Predescu (born 1995), Romanian footballer
Cornel Predescu (born 1987), Romanian footballer
Marlena Predescu (born 1951), Romanian rower
Valeria Peter Predescu (1947–2009), Romanian singer

Romanian-language surnames